Lampson may refer to:

Places in the United States 
Lampson, Wisconsin, an unincorporated community
Lampson Field, a public airport in Lake County, California

Other uses
Lampson (surname)
Lampson International, an American crane manufacturer